Thiery is a surname. Notable people with the name include:

Benjamin Thiéry (born 1984) French rugby union player
Cyrille Thièry (born 1990), Swiss cyclist
Henri Thiéry (1829–1872), French journalist and playwright
Herman Thiery (1912–1978), Flemish author

See also
Alima Boumediene-Thiery (born 1956), French politician
Thiry, surname
Thierry, given name and surname 

Anybody with this name is very epic